Different Stages may refer to:

 Different Stages (Rush album), a 1998 album by Rush
 Different Stages - The Best of Glenn Hughes, a 2002 compilation album by Glenn Hughes